The 1970 Wake Forest Demon Deacons football team was an American football team that represented Wake Forest University during the 1970 NCAA University Division football season. In its second season under head coach Cal Stoll, the team compiled a 6–5 record, finished in first place in the Atlantic Coast Conference with a 5–1 record against conference opponents.

Schedule

Team leaders

References

Wake Forest
Wake Forest Demon Deacons football seasons
Atlantic Coast Conference football champion seasons
Wake Forest Demon Deacons football